{{DISPLAYTITLE:C11H15NO2S}}
The molecular formula C11H15NO2S (molar mass: 225.31 g/mol, exact mass: 225.0823 u) may refer to:

 Ethiofencarb
 Methiocarb

Molecular formulas